Yelena Suyazova (born 15 June 1989) is a handball player from Kazakhstan. She has played on the Kazakhstan women's national handball team, and participated at the 2011 World Women's Handball Championship in Brazil.

References

1989 births
Living people
Kazakhstani female handball players
Handball players at the 2010 Asian Games
Handball players at the 2014 Asian Games
Handball players at the 2018 Asian Games
Asian Games bronze medalists for Kazakhstan
Asian Games medalists in handball
Medalists at the 2014 Asian Games
21st-century Kazakhstani women